Norbeck-Williamson Act of 1929 or Mount Rushmore National Memorial Act of 1929 established the Mount Rushmore National Memorial Commission defining the powers and purpose of the twelve member committee. The Act of Congress authorized the Mount Harney Memorial Association of South Dakota to stone carve models of George Washington, Thomas Jefferson, Abraham Lincoln, and Theodore Roosevelt in the Harney National Forest encompassed by the Black Hills National Forest. The granite sculpture was to be created in accordance with the rock relief designs by Gutzon Borglum.

In 1928, the 70th Congressional session members Peter Norbeck and William Williamson formulated the code of law for the Mount Rushmore National Memorial Act. The Senate bill was passed by the United States Congressional session and enacted into law by the 30th President of the United States Calvin Coolidge on February 29, 1929.

Clauses of the Act
The Mount Rushmore National Memorial Commission Act was drafted as six sections describing the purposes of the United States statute.
 
Sec. 1 - Commission Composition and Creation
Members allowance for expenses
Compensation for secretary

Sec. 2 - Organization
Selection of treasurer
Membership of executive committee

Sec. 3 - Completion of Memorial

Sec. 4 - Authority
Mount Harney Memorial Association property rights
Disbursement and receivables of funds
Employment of artists and sculptors
Other powers

Sec. 5 - Federal Contribution Limitation
Advance to treasurer of appropriated funds
Condition of funds to treasurer

Sec. 6 - Report to Congress

Amendments to 1929 Act
U.S. Congressional amendments to the Mount Rushmore National Memorial Commission Act.

See also

Documentary Film Bibliography

Further reading

External links
 
 
 
 
 
 
 
 
 
 
 
 

1929 in American law
70th United States Congress
Mount Rushmore